Liu Xiaokai (born March 1962) is an ethnic Miao politician from China. He was born in Taijiang County, Guizhou province. He joined the Chinese Communist Party in April 1985. He graduated from the mechanical engineering department at Tsinghua University in Beijing.  He was, successively, the party chief of Jianhe County, the commissioner of Qiandongnan Miao and Dong Autonomous Prefecture, the acting commissioner of Qiannan Buyei and Miao Autonomous Prefecture, and the prefecture party chief of Bijie. In January 2008, he was named vice-governor of Guizhou. He was named in July 2012 as Guizhou Shengwei Changwei and the head of the United Front Work Department of Guizhou province.

Liu was an alternate member of the 17th Central Committee of the Chinese Communist Party and, since 2015, a full member of the 18th Central Committee of the Chinese Communist Party, having been elevated from alternate to full membership at the Fifth Plenum of the 18th Central Committee upon the expulsion of Ling Jihua from the body.

References

Living people
Tsinghua University alumni
1962 births
People from Qiandongnan
Miao people